Orlov is the name of several inhabited localities in Russia.

Modern localities
Orlov, Kirov Oblast, town
  Rural localities
 Villages
Orlova, Irkutsk Oblast
 Orlova, Sverdlovsk Oblast
 Khutors
Orlov, Alexeyevsky District, Belgorod Oblast
Orlov, Veydelevsky District
Orlov, Krasnodar Krai
 Settlements
Orlov, Kursk Oblast
Orlov, Oryol Oblast

Alternative names
Orlov, alternative name of Orlovo, a village under the administrative jurisdiction of Kiknur Urban-Type Settlement in Kiknursky District of Kirov Oblast;